The Devil You Know is a collection of short stories by American author Poppy Z. Brite published in 2003 by Subterranean Press.

Stories 
"Dispatches from Tanganyika: A Foreword"
"The Devil You Know"
"Oh Death, Where Is Thy Spatula? (A Dr. Brite story)"
"Lantern Marsh"
"Nothing of Him That Doth Fade"
"The Ocean"
"Marisol (A Dr. Brite story)"
"Poivre"
"Pansu"
"Burn, Baby, Burn"
"System Freeze"
"Bayou de la Mère"
"The Heart of New Orleans (A Dr. Brite story)"
"A Season in Heck"

Reception 
Publishers Weekly describes the book as follows: "Abandoning past gothic trappings and using a cleaner, simpler style, Brite emerges as a writer of honesty and wit."

References

2003 short story collections
Short story collections by Poppy Z. Brite
Subterranean Press books